The Oxford University Conservative Association (OUCA) is a student Conservative association founded in 1924, whose members are drawn from the University of Oxford. Since October 2009, OUCA has been affiliated to Conservative Future and its successor, the Young Conservatives, the Conservative Party youth wing.

OUCA alumni include many prominent Conservative Party figures, including four former prime ministers of the United Kingdom and scores of former cabinet ministers and senior government officials. Among them are Margaret Thatcher, Edward Heath, David Cameron, Theresa May, William Hague, Jeremy Hunt, Sir George Young, Ann Widdecombe, Jacob Rees-Mogg and the Earl of Dartmouth. Thatcher and Heath served as presidents of the association, as did prominent British journalists Jonathan Aitken, William Rees-Mogg, Daniel Hannan and Nick Robinson. Former Labour ministers Ed Balls and Chris Bryant are also OUCA alumni.

Committee 
OUCA is run by its officers and committee, who are elected on a termly basis. The association has six senior officers, namely the president, the president-elect, the treasurer, the treasurer-elect, the secretary, and the political officer, who chairs Port and Policy each week and is also responsible for organising campaigning events and social action. Four junior officers also help manage the association, as do its six committee members. OUCA's returning officer is responsible for running the elections and for administering the association's internal disciplinary procedures. The president may appoint non-executive officers, such as a press officer.

In October 2018, OUCA announced that members of the Bullingdon Club would be banned from holding office within the association. OUCA president, Ben Etty, said the club's "values and activities had no place in the modern Conservative Party". This decision was overturned by the association's disciplinary committee, as non-members were brought to the council meeting that voted for the ban. Despite this, the ban was subsequently reimposed by the association's senior member, Brian Young.

Relationship with the national Conservative Party 

OUCA members sometimes stand for election to Oxford City Council. The council has traditionally been Labour-dominated, and the Conservatives have not held a seat on it since 2001. Alexander Stafford (president, Michaelmas 2007) stood unsuccessfully for Holywell Ward in the 2008 Oxford City Council election, achieving an 8.2% swing for the Conservatives. His brother Gregory, now a councillor in the London Borough of Ealing, stood in the same ward in 2004. More recently, Poppy Stokes and OUCA president Maryam Ahmed stood for the Conservatives in the 2014 Oxford City Council Election in the Holywell and Carfax wards respectively. This trend of putting up students as candidates in the city centre continued in the 2016 city council election, when OUCA president, George Walker, stood in Holywell Ward.

Oxford University Tory Reform Group 

Julian Critchley described the OUCA that he encountered on his arrival at Pembroke College in 1951. Despite its 2,000 members, he said, "it was dominated by a patrician clique who preserved their power by preventing the membership at large from electing officers of the association. These were chosen by the committee which, although directly elected, was easily open to manipulation." Critchley and Michael Heseltine, defeated in their bids for OUCA office, set up a rival Conservative society, the Blue Ribbon Club.

In 1965 a group of OUCA members formed the Oxford University Tory Reform Group, pre-dating the national Tory Reform Group organisation. The OUTRG acted as a "one nation conservative" pressure group in Oxford, although it had a substantially smaller membership than OUCA. Interest declined as the national party became more moderate, and the OUTRG voted to disband and merge with OUCA during Michaelmas term 2007.

In an email to OUTRG members, its president Luke Connoly reported that an extraordinary general meeting held at the Lamb & Flag pub at 3pm on 18 November 2007 unanimously voted to dissolve the OUTRG as of midday Saturday 8th week (1 December 2007) and to merge with OUCA. He cited falling attendance and a belief that OUCA had "genuinely become more liberal", adding that the merger "will make debate between wings of the party much easier and more productive". Later in the year, Douglas Hurd, a patron of the national TRG, lamented the disbanding of the Oxford branch, saying that it was "very important that the One Nation view is powerfully represented".

Port and Policy 

OUCA's hosts regular events named Port and Policy, which involves debate. Between Trinity Term 1994 and Michaelmas 2012, Port and Policy was held eight times a term on Sunday evenings in the Oxford Union. In Michaelmas 2012 the Oxford Union did not renew the contract, and OUCA used other Oxford venues. As of January 2023, Port and Policy has returned to the Oxford Union. Although the format is decided by the president and the political officer, two pre-announced motions are usually debated, followed by an emergency motion. In May 2007, Port and Policy featured in the Channel 4 documentary Make Me a Tory. The growth in attendance at Port and Policy was mentioned in a 2008 Financial Times article as possible evidence of growing popularity for the Conservatives among students.

In the media 

The Channel 4 documentary Make Me a Tory, produced by Daniel Cormack, aired on 13 May 2007. It included footage from one of OUCA's Port and Policy meetings and an interview with Conservative party leader David Cameron.

In Trinity term 2010, just over a week before the 2010 general election, the Oxford Mail reported John Major's visit to the association.

In Hilary term 2011, Courtney Love took part in a Port and Policy event. She joined the association, and the president appointed her non-executive officer for rock and roll.

Controversy

No Platform Referendum 1986 
In December 1985 the Oxford University Student Union adopted a No Platform policy for racists and fascists. OUCA organised a petition of almost 700 signatures, more than the minimum requirement, to put the policy to a referendum of the student union's members. OUCA President Nick Levy described the policy as "a serious infringement of the basic democratic right to freedom of speech". OUCA led the subsequent campaign to overturn the policy. No Platform was rejected by a vote of 3,152 against with 2,246 in favour in the referendum in late February 1986.

Accusations of racism 

In 2000 four OUCA members were expelled from a meeting for making "Nazi-style salutes". The New Statesman reported that a member of the OUCA committee at the university's 2001 Fresher's Fair greeted new students by saying, "Welcome to OUCA – the biggest political group for young people since the Hitler Youth". Another member was dismissed from the Oxford University Student Union's executive for "marching up and down doing a Nazi salute". In 2007 a drunken OUCA member gave a Nazi salute at a meeting attended by a former Tory MP.

In 2004 an ex-treasurer of the association was found guilty of bringing OUCA into disrepute "after posting 'offensive' comments about India in a newsletter". At an OUCA hustings in 2009, two candidates made racist jokes, encouraged by others present. The incident led to national media coverage and an investigation by the university, which then refused to re-register the association, forcing it to drop University from its name and become OCA (Oxford Conservative Association). As a result of the incident, two members were expelled from the national Conservative party, and the Oxford Union banned OUCA from using its premises for hustings and in-camera events.

In 2011 The Oxford Student newspaper received leaked video footage of an OUCA member singing the first line of a song glorifying the Nazi Party in the Junior Common Room of Corpus Christi College after an OUCA meeting at the Oxford Union in 2010. This led to the resignation of some current and former members of the association. The university launched an investigation into the society as a result of the reports. The dean of Corpus Christi subsequently banned all OUCA events at the college indefinitely.

In 2020 a member standing in the OUCA elections was reported to have quoted from the Rivers of Blood speech while at a drinking event. The member later resigned his membership, and dropped out of the election. During the same election, the losing presidential candidate, who would have been the association's first black president had he been elected, raised accusations that the election had been rigged against him. He was then expelled from the association after its disciplinary committee ruled that he had brought OUCA into disrepute by raising false allegations.

Unpaid debt 

On 25 February 2012 The Daily Telegraph reported that the association had had an unpaid debt of more than £1200 in relation to a charity event held "in support of the Army Benevolent Fund at the Cavalry and Guards Club on Pall Mall in June 2009", which had not been settled until the beginning of 2012. As a result of this and other administrative shortcomings, the university for a second time refused to re-register the association for a period of 12 months, during which time it was again known as OCA, regaining university affiliation at the start of Trinity term 2012.

Financial and interpersonal misconduct 
On the 22 October 2021, Cherwell reported that several complaints of financial and interpersonal misconduct had been made to the disciplinary committee of OUCA against the then president, Kamran Ali. The decision of the disciplinary committee to remove the president from office was overturned on appeal on procedural grounds.

See also 
 Cambridge University Conservative Association
 Oxford University Liberal Democrats
 Oxford University Labour Club

References 

Bibliography
Anthony Berry and Douglas Wilson (eds.) with a foreword by the Rt. Hon. Anthony Eden, Conservative Oxford (Oxford University Conservative Association, Oxford, 1949) OCLC: 67886997
Martin Ceadel, "The 'King and Country' Debate, 1933: Student Politics, Pacifism and the Dictators". The Historical Journal, Vol. 22, No. 2 (June 1979), pp. 397–422 Jstor link

External links 
 Official website
 Facebook page

Conservative Future
Lists of people associated with the University of Oxford
Clubs and societies of the University of Oxford
Politics of Oxford
1924 establishments in England
Student organizations established in 1924